Grace Under Pressure is a studio album by jazz guitarist John Scofield. It features fellow guitarist Bill Frisell, bassist Charlie Haden and drummer Joey Baron. Five of the ten tracks also feature a brass trio led by Randy Brecker.

Track listing
All tracks composed by John Scofield

"You Bet" - 5:33
"Grace Under Pressure" - 8:23
"Honest I Do" - 4:23
"Scenes from a Marriage" - 8:50
"Twang" - 6:09
"Pat Me" - 5:59
"Pretty Out" - 7:10
"Bill Me" - 8:37
"Same Axe" - 3:01
"Unique New York" - 5:00

Personnel
John Scofield - electric guitar
Bill Frisell - electric & acoustic guitars
Charlie Haden - bass
Joey Baron - drums

On 3, 5, 6, 8 & 10:
Randy Brecker - flugelhorn
Jim Pugh - trombone
John Clark - French horn

References 

1992 albums
John Scofield albums
Blue Note Records albums